Rangeview High School is a public high school in Aurora, Colorado, United States. It is the second newest of five high schools in  Aurora Public Schools. The school offers a variety of Advanced Placement courses.

The school is being used as a polling station and was featured on CNN, with Dan Simon reporting.

Building

Rangeview High School was founded in 1983. The building holds over eighty academic classrooms, along with a library/media center that was built in 2004. The non-academic side consists of a large gymnasium, a small gymnasium, a standard swimming pool, an auditorium, a commons area, and a dual weight room. The original foundation of the school was built to serve roughly 1800 students; however, to meet population growth, Rangeview has added several portable classrooms adjacent to the building.

Demographics
As of the 2014-15 school year:
White 29.2%
Hispanic 33.8%
African American 24.9%
Asian American 5.0%
Native American 0.9%

Athletics

Girls' cross country
 State Champion 1992

Boys' basketball
 State Champion 1985, 2019

Girls' soccer 
State Champion 1994

Girls' track and field
State Champion 1993

Rivalries

Rangeview's rival school is Gateway High School, also part of Aurora Public Schools. The rivalry has lasted since the founding of Rangeview, half of whose initial students were taken from Gateway, and spans all sports and competitions.  The winner of the annual football game is awarded the Anvil trophy. Rangeview has maintained possession of the Anvil since the last game played in 2017.

Alumni

 India Arie, musician, relocated to Atlanta before graduation 
 Davy Armstrong, '10, midfielder for the Colorado Rapids
 Chloe Johnson, '07, television personality, beauty pageant title holder, model, dancer and community leader

References

External links

Aurora Public Schools (Colorado)
Public high schools in Colorado
Schools in Arapahoe County, Colorado
Educational institutions established in 1983
1983 establishments in Colorado